Sanu railway station is a small railway station in Jaisalmer district, Rajasthan. Its code is SANU. It serves Sanu town. The station will consists of two platforms. The station will be the terminal on Jaisalmer–Sanu line which under construction and this will be last Indian station in Jaisalmer district towards Pakistan.

References

Railway stations in Jaisalmer district
Jodhpur railway division